"À tout jamais" is a song recorded by French singer Mylène Farmer for her twelfth studio album, L'Emprise. The song was written by Farmer in collaboration with French musician Woodkid. 

The song was released as the lead single on 26 August 2022.

Critical reception
Léna Lutaud from Le Figaro stated that "À tout jamais" is a dark and light song at the same time, in it Farmer renews herself, returning to her early gothic roots, she also called this song a very successful first single. Margaux Bonfils of France Info called the song "a dark ultramodern electropop revelation, a requiem to start all over again".

Music video 
The official music video was directed by Tobias Gremmler. It was released on 12 September 2022.

Track listing
Digital download and streaming
"À tout jamais" – 3:46

CD maxi
"À tout jamais" (Version Single)
"À tout jamais" (NPD'S Remix)
"À tout jamais" (D Remix - Distortion Remix)
"À tout jamais" (MM Remix - Master Manipulation Remix)
"À tout jamais" (Control Remix)
"À tout jamais" (Version Instrumentale)

LP maxi
A1. "À tout jamais" (NPD'S Remix)
A2. "À tout jamais" (MM Remix - Master Manipulation Remix)
B1. "À tout jamais" (D Remix - Distortion Remix)
B2. "À tout jamais" (Control Remix)
B3. "À tout jamais" (Version Single)

Charts

Weekly charts

Year-end charts

Release history

References

Mylène Farmer songs
2022 singles
2022 songs
Songs with lyrics by Mylène Farmer
Sony Music singles